The Daytona Beach Seniors Golf Classic was a golf tournament on the Champions Tour from 1983 to 1984. It was played in Daytona Beach, Florida at the Pelican Bay Golf and Country Club, now known as the Club at Pelican Bay.

The purse for the 1984 tournament was US$150,000, with $22,500 going to the winner. The tournament was founded in 1983 as the Greater Daytona Senior Classic.

Winners
Daytona Beach Seniors Golf Classic
1984 Orville Moody

Greater Daytona Senior Classic
1983 Gene Littler

Source:

References

Former PGA Tour Champions events
Golf in Florida
1983 establishments in Florida
1984 disestablishments in Florida
Recurring sporting events established in 1983
Recurring sporting events disestablished in 1984
Sports in Daytona Beach, Florida